Buker is a surname. Notable people with the name include:

Brian L. Buker (1949–1970), American soldier
Cy Buker (1918–2011), American baseball player
Henry Buker (1859–1899), American baseball player
Ray Buker (1899–1992), American track and field athlete

See also
Büker, surname
Bucher, surname
Bucker (disambiguation), includes a list of people with surname Bucker